Annacotty is a suburban town on the outskirts of Limerick, Ireland,  from the centre of the city.

History
The village originally grew up around the grain mills which harnessed the water power of the River Mulkear. Clonkeen Church was established as a monastic site c. AD 600. Annacotty Co-Operative Society was founded in the 1890s and butter was made at the creamery up to the 1960s when it was taken over by Black Abbey Co-operative of Adare (which, after a succession of mergers, became part of the Dairygold Co-op). The creamery had been transformed into a Co-Operative hardware store which closed in August 2009. The building is currently operating as Irish-owned store Mr. Price.

With the expansion of Limerick from 1990, Annacotty has been swallowed up into the rapidly growing suburb of Castletroy. The N7, which originally ran through the main street, by passed the village as it was then, in 1980 when a new bridge was built over the Mulkear 100m downstream. Annacotty officially became part of Limerick City following the May 2014 local government elections with local Councillors elected as part of the Limerick City Metropolitan District. Prior to this local Councillors were elected to Limerick County Council, a separate authority to the old City Council.

Annacotty Industrial Estate was built on the former site of the Ferenka factory. Opened in March 1972 by the AKZO Group to manufacture steelcord, it achieved notoriety when its Dutch managing director Tiede Herrema was kidnapped by IRA Volunteers Eddie Gallagher and Marion Coyle in October 1975 and freed four weeks later following a protracted siege in Monasterevin, County Kildare. After sustaining continuing losses and experiencing numerous industrial disputes from the day it opened, the factory closed down in December 1977 with the loss of over 1,400 full-time jobs.

Annacotty is the home of two clubs. Aisling Annacotty is the local football club and UL Bohemian's is the local Rugby club located on Mulkear Drive.

Annacotty is the birthplace of the Limerick inter-county hurler Jackie Power and a statue of him stands on the main street. Former Irish rugby international Peter Clohessy also comes from the town.

Transport
Annacotty railway station opened on 8 August 1858, but finally closed on 9 September 1963.

See also
 List of towns and villages in Ireland

References

External links

Limerick (city)
Towns and villages in County Limerick